The Carapari River is a river of Argentina and Bolivia.

See also
List of rivers of Argentina
List of rivers of Bolivia

References
 Rand McNally, The New International Atlas, 1993.
  GEOnet Names Server 

Rivers of Argentina
Rivers of Salta Province
Rivers of Tarija Department